Denis Buckley (born 9 August 1990) is a rugby union player from Ireland. He predominantly plays as a loosehead prop. Buckley currently plays for Irish provincial team Connacht in the Pro14. He plays his club rugby for Buccaneers.

Buckley has represented Ireland internationally at under-age level, and played for the Emerging Ireland side at the 2015 Tbilisi Cup. However, he has yet to represent Ireland at full international level.

Early life
Raised in County Roscommon, Buckley first played rugby with local club Creggs RFC, later moving to Athlone-based team Buccaneers. Buckley was a student at Blackrock College. He has also studied at NUI Galway. Buckley joined the Connacht academy in 2009.

Career

Connacht
Buckley became part of Connacht's academy ahead of the 2009–10 season. In September 2011, while in his third year at the academy, Buckley made his first appearance for the team. He came on as a replacement in a 2011–12 Pro12 match against Benetton Treviso. His first European appearance came against Toulouse in the 2011–12 Heineken Cup on 14 January 2012, also as a replacement. Buckley made his first start on 24 February that year in a Pro 12 match with Edinburgh. In total, his first season saw him make eight Pro 12 appearances and feature in two Heineken Cup games for the province.

Buckley became part of Connacht's senior squad the following season and played more regularly for the team, starting seven matches in the 2012–13 Pro12 and making 15 appearances in the competition overall. He also featured in five of the team's six matches in the 2012–13 Heineken Cup, starting in the game away against Zebre, and in both ties with Harlequins. Buckley signed a new contract in November 2012 to keep him with the province until 2015.

Buckley suffered a slow start to the following season, with injuries meaning he did not make his first appearance until 29 November 2013 when he was a replacement against Edinburgh in the 2013–14 Pro12. His next game came in that season's Heineken Cup, where he came on from the bench in a famous victory over four time European champions Toulouse in France. He appeared in four of Connacht's pool games in the Cup, being a replacement on each occasion. In February 2014, Connacht's first choice loosehead prop, Brett Wilkinson, suffered a neck injury against Saracens, which ultimately forced him to retire. This saw Buckley play more frequently for the province, starting all but two of Connacht's remaining matches and featuring as a replacement in the others. Buckley made a total of 14 appearances in the 2013–14 Pro12, six of these coming as a replacement.

Buckley earned his 200th cap for Connacht in a 20–12 loss to Benetton on 29 May 2021 during the Pro14 Rainbow Cup.

International

Ireland
Buckley has also been involved with Ireland at under-age international level. He was part of the Irish set up at school's and under-18 level. Although he was part of Allen Clarke's Ireland under-20 squads for both the Under-20 Six Nations and Junior World Cup in 2010, he never made an appearance for the side. At senior level, Buckley was selected for the Emerging Ireland squad to participate in the 2015 Tbilisi Cup, again coached by Clarke. He played in two of the team's three games as they won the tournament for the first time.

Barbarians
In May 2018, Buckley was called up for international invitational side the Barbarians, coached by his former Connacht boss Pat Lam. He was named to start against  alongside his Connacht teammates Niyi Adeolokun and Ultan Dillane.

Honours

Individual
Pro12 Dream Team (2): 2014–15, 2015–16
Connacht
Pro14 Championship (1): 2015–16

References

External links
 

1990 births
Living people
Alumni of the University of Galway
Buccaneers RFC players
Connacht Rugby players
Irish rugby union players
Rugby union players from County Galway
Sportspeople from County Roscommon
Rugby union players from County Roscommon
People educated at Blackrock College
Rugby union props